Roberto Castro (born June 23, 1985) is an American professional golfer who plays on the PGA Tour.

Amateur career
Castro played college golf at Georgia Tech. While at Georgia Tech, he was named first-team All-American in 2005, second-team All-American in 2007 and honorable mention All-American in 2004 and 2006. He was named to the All-Atlantic Coast Conference (ACC) team every year during his four years at Georgia Tech and was named ACC Rookie of the Year in 2004. He won one collegiate event, the 2007 Puerto Rico Classic. He won the 2007 Byron Nelson Award which is given to the nation's top senior golfer.

In 2005, Castro was the captain for the United States Palmer Cup team that defeated Europe 14–10. He was also a member of the 2006 team that lost 19½–4½.

In 2008 Castro was awarded the prestigious NCAA Top VIII Award.

Professional career
Castro played on the eGolf Professional Tour from 2007 to 2010 and won five events during that time. He played in 12 events on the Nationwide Tour in 2010 and recorded a runner-up finish at the Preferred Health Systems Wichita Open. His first full year on the Nationwide Tour came in 2011 where he recorded four top-10 finishes and placed 23rd on the money list, good enough for a PGA Tour card for 2012. He also tied for 13th at qualifying School, improving his status. On May 9, 2013, Castro shot a 63 on the opening day of The Players Championship to equal the course record set by Fred Couples (1992) and Greg Norman (1994). He had his best finish on the PGA Tour in June 2013, when Castro finished as runner-up, three strokes behind Bill Haas at the AT&T National. He finished 2nd again in 2016 after losing in a playoff at the Wells Fargo Championship against James Hahn.

Personal life
Castro was born in Houston, Texas. His father is from Peru and his mother is from Costa Rica. Castro is the nephew of former LPGA Tour golfer Jenny Lidback. Castro has two younger brothers, both of whom also played collegiate golf. Alex Castro played for Georgia State University from 2007-2011 and youngest brother Franco began his career at LSU before transferring to the University of North Carolina at Charlotte in 2012. Castro and his wife Katie reside in Atlanta, Georgia, with their two daughters. He is a member of the Ansley Golf Club.

Amateur wins (1)
2001 AJGA Greater Greensboro Chrysler Junior

Professional wins (6)

eGolf Professional Tour wins (5)
2007 Spring Creek Classic
2008 River Hills Open
2009 Spring Creek Championship, The Championship at Savannah Harbor
2010 Savannah Quarters Classic

Other wins (1)
2009 Georgia Open

Playoff record
PGA Tour playoff record (0–1)

Results in major championships

CUT = missed the half-way cut
"T" = tied

Summary

Most consecutive cuts made – 1 (twice)
Longest streak of top-10s – 0

Results in The Players Championship

CUT = missed the halfway cut
"T" indicates a tie for a place

Results in World Golf Championships
Results not in chronological order before 2015.

QF, R16, R32, R64 = Round in which player lost in match play
"T" = Tied

U.S. national team appearances
Amateur
Palmer Cup: 2005 (winners), 2006

See also
2011 Nationwide Tour graduates
2011 PGA Tour Qualifying School graduates
2015 Web.com Tour Finals graduates
2018 Web.com Tour Finals graduates

References

External links

Profile on Georgia Tech's official athletic site

American male golfers
Georgia Tech Yellow Jackets men's golfers
PGA Tour golfers
Korn Ferry Tour graduates
American people of Costa Rican descent
American sportspeople of North American descent
American sportspeople of Peruvian descent
Golfers from Houston
Golfers from Atlanta
1985 births
Living people